William Turner (1893 – December 4, 1916), nicknamed "Aggie", was an American Negro league infielder in the 1910s.

A native of Indianapolis, Indiana, Turner made his Negro leagues debut in 1910 with the Indianapolis ABCs. He went on to play five seasons for the ABCs. Turner died in Chicago, Illinois in 1916 at age 22 or 23.

References

External links
  and Seamheads

1893 births
Date of birth missing
1916 deaths
Indianapolis ABCs players
Baseball players from Indianapolis
20th-century African-American sportspeople
Baseball infielders